Josiah Collins V (1864-1949) was an American attorney, civil servant and politician who was Seattle Fire Commissioner and a State Senator. He was Seattle's Fire Chief at the time of the Great Seattle Fire on June 6, 1889. On that date, he was in San Francisco, attending a regional conference of Fire Chiefs.

Biography

Josiah Collins was born in Hillsborough, North Carolina on June 17, 1864. He moved to Washington in 1883, where he became a lawyer.

He was chief of the volunteer fire department at the time of the Great Seattle Fire in 1889.

He was one of the cofounders of the first golf clubs in Seattle at Laurelhurst in 1895.

Initially a Democrat, he joined the Republican Party in 1896. He served as a member of the Washington State Senate from 1911 to 1915.

He married Caroline Wetherill in June 1907, and they had two sons.

He died in Seattle on July 1, 1949.

References

Geni: Josiah Collins V
HistoryLink: Seattle Fire Department
Seattle PI: Museum displays Seattle Fire Bell
HistoryLink: Daughter in Law Patsy Bullitt Collins

1864 births
1949 deaths
American fire chiefs
History of Seattle
Lawyers from Seattle
Washington (state) lawyers
Republican Party Washington (state) state senators